Cartridges of the World is a comprehensive guide to firearm cartridges.  The reference series is written by Frank C. Barnes. The latest version of the book is its 16th edition, published in 2019, and edited by W. Todd Woodard.

Editions
 1st edition, 1965, ASIN B000CRY476 
 2nd edition, 1969, ASIN #
 3rd edition, 1976,  
 4th edition, 1980,  
 5th edition, 1985,  
 6th edition, 1989,  
 7th edition, 1993,  
 8th edition, 1997,  
 9th edition, 2000,  
 10th edition, 2003,  
 11th edition, 2006,  
 12th edition, 2009,  
 13th edition, 2012, 
 14th edition, 2014,  
 15th edition, 2016, 
 16th edition, 2019,

Criticism
The series of books has often been criticised for not including dimensioned drawings of cartridges and for placing some cartridges into unusual categories (for example, the 11th edition of the book places the .303 British round inside the section of American Military Cartridges.)

References

External links 
 A list of items published by Gun Digest Books
 A Google Books synopsis of the content

Book publishing companies of the United States
Firearm books
1965 non-fiction books